Juan Mardoqueo Vásquez Vásquez (born 19 June 1995) is a Guatemalan racing cyclist who currently rides for the Hino–One–La Red team.

Major results

2015
 3rd Road Race, National Under–23 Road Championships
2016
 1st  Overall Vuelta de la Juventud Guatemala
1st Stage 2
2017
 1st  Overall Vuelta al Altiplano Marquense
1st Stage 3
 5th Road Race, National Road Championships
2018
 National Road Championships
1st  Road Race
6th Time Trial
 10th Overall Vuelta a Guatemala
2019
 National Road Championships
1st  Road Race
6th Time Trial
 3rd Overall Vuelta a Guatemala
1st Stage 8
2020
 1st  Overall Vuelta a Guatemala
1st  Guatemalan rider classification
1st Stages 5 & 7
 1st Stage 2 Vuelta a Chiriquí
2022
 National Road Championships
1st  Road Race
2nd Time Trial
 1st  Overall Vuelta a Guatemala
1st Stages 4 & 6

References

External links

Guatemalan male cyclists
1995 births
Living people
People from Totonicapán Department